Bareilly International University is located at Pilibhit Bypass Road, Bareilly, Uttar Pradesh, India. It is a private university that was granted university status by the Government of Uttar Pradesh (vide BIU Act No. 26 of 2016, dated 16th Sept 2016). The university is fostered by the Rohilkhand Charitable Educational Trust and is functional with its medical and non-medical courses from the 2016-2017 semester.

Constituent Colleges
The university has the following constituent colleges:
Rohilkhand Medical College & Hospital.
Rohilkhand Institute of Dental Sciences.
Rohilkhand College of Nursing.
Rohilkhand School of Nursing.
Rohilkhand College of Paramedical Sciences.
Rohilkhand College of Pharmacy.
Rohilkhand College of Applied Sciences & Technology.
Rohilkhand College of Management.
Rohilkhand College of Humanities and Journalism.

Campus
The university occupies a campus of about 44.5 acres. It has academic, hospital, and residential blocks, including gardens, with a rain-water harvesting  and recycling system.

Departments
The university comprises the following departments:

References

External links

 
Education in Bareilly
2016 establishments in Uttar Pradesh
Educational institutions established in 2016
Rohilkhand